Metaglycodol (INN) is a drug described as a tranquilizer which was never marketed.

See also 
 Phenaglycodol
 Fenpentadiol

References 

Vicinal diols
Chloroarenes
Sedatives
Abandoned drugs